The 2016 United Kingdom European Union membership referendum took place in the United Kingdom and Gibraltar on 23 June 2016. Membership of the European Union had been a topic of political debate in the United Kingdom since the country joined the European Communities (then commonly referred to as the "Common Market" by the British people) in 1973. This referendum was conducted very differently from the European Communities membership referendum in 1975; a more localised and regionalised counting procedure was used, and the ballot was overseen by the Electoral Commission, a public body which did not exist at the time of the first vote. This article lists, by voting area for Great Britain and Gibraltar and by parliamentary constituency for Northern Ireland, all the results of the referendum, each ordered into national and regional sections.

Under the provisions of the European Union Referendum Act 2015, there were a total of 382 voting areas across twelve regions, using the same boundaries as used in European Parliamentary elections since 1999, under the provisions of the European Parliamentary Elections Act 2002, with votes counted at local authority level. In England the 326 local government districts were used as the voting areas; these consist of all unitary authorities, all metropolitan boroughs, all shire districts, the London boroughs, the City of London and the Isles of Scilly. The nine regions of England were then also used to count the votes at the regional level, with Gibraltar being regarded as part of South West England. Northern Ireland was a single voting area as well as being a regional count, although local totals by Westminster parliamentary constituency area were announced. In Scotland the 32 Scottish council areas were used as voting areas, and there was a single national count. In Wales the 22 Welsh council areas were used as the voting areas, and there was a single national count.

Verification and counting began as soon as the polls closed on 23 June from 22:00 BST onwards (making it the first UK-wide referendum to be counted overnight) and took nine hours and twenty minutes to complete. The result of the referendum was forecast by the BBC just before 04:40 BST (around 6 hours 40 minutes after polls closed), with around 308 results declared at the time. The first result announced was Gibraltar, and the last was Cornwall.

On 24 June 2016, the recorded result was that the UK voted to leave the European Union by 51.89% for Leave to 48.11% for Remain, a small margin of 3.78%. This corresponded to 17,410,742 votes to leave and 16,141,241 to remain, a margin of 1,269,501 votes.

United Kingdom

The final result of the referendum for the United Kingdom and Gibraltar was declared at Manchester Town Hall at 0720 BST on Friday 24 June 2016, after all the 382 voting areas and the twelve UK regions had declared their results, by the then Chief Counting Officer (CCO) for the referendum, Jenny Watson. In a UK-wide referendum, the position of Chief Counting Officer (CCO) is held by the chair of the Electoral Commission. The following figures are as reported by the Electoral Commission.

With a national turnout of 72.21%, the target to secure the majority win for the winning side was 16,788,672 votes. The decision by the electorate was to "Leave the European Union", voters for which secured a majority of 1,269,501 votes (3.78%) over those who had voted in favour of "Remain a member of the European Union", with England and Wales voting to "Leave" while Scotland and Northern Ireland voted to "Remain".

Results by United Kingdom regions

Results by United Kingdom constituent countries & Gibraltar

Results from the 30 largest cities in the United Kingdom
Out of over 33.5 million valid votes cast across the United Kingdom, over 8.8 million, or just over one quarter, were cast in thirty major cities that each gathered 100,000 votes or more. 16 of those cities voted to Leave, and 14 voted to Remain, or 53% Leave and 47% Remain.

In those 30 cities, votes to Remain outnumbered those to Leave by over 900,000 (about 4.9 million to 4 million or 55.2% to 44.8%), while in the other voting areas, the votes to Leave outnumbered those to Remain by nearly 2.2 million (about 13.5 million to 11.3 million, or 54.4% to 45.6%).

England
The English local districts were used as the voting areas for the referendum in England; these consist of all unitary authorities, all metropolitan districts, all non-metropolitan districts, the London boroughs, the City of London and the Isles of Scilly.

Unlike the other constituent countries of the United Kingdom there was no centralised national count of the votes in England as counting was done within the nine separate regions. Figures from Gibraltar are included in the South West England region.

England was broken down into 9 regional count areas using the same regional constituency boundaries as used in European Parliamentary elections.

East Midlands 

The East Midlands region was broken down into 40 voting areas.

East of England 

The East of England region was broken down into 47 voting areas.

Greater London 

The Greater London region was broken down into 33 voting areas.

North East England 

The North East England region was broken down into 12 voting areas.

North West England 

The North West England region was broken down into 39 voting areas.

South East England 

The South East England region was broken down into 67 voting areas.

South West England (including Gibraltar)  

The South West England region was broken down into 38 voting areas.

Gibraltar
For the purposes of this referendum and as had been the case with previous European Parliamentary elections, the overseas territory of Gibraltar was a single voting area placed in the South West England constituency. It is the first time the territory has taken part in any UK-wide referendum as it did not participate in either the original 1975 EC Referendum or the 2011 AV Referendum as Gibraltar does not send any Members of Parliament to the House of Commons in Westminster.

West Midlands 

The West Midlands region was broken down into 30 voting areas.

Yorkshire and the Humber 

The Yorkshire and the Humber region was broken down into 21 voting areas.

Northern Ireland 
Northern Ireland was a single voting area, as well as being a regional count although local totals were announced in each of the Westminster parliamentary constituency areas within Northern Ireland.

Northern Ireland local totals by Parliamentary constituencies.

Scotland 

The Scottish council areas were used as the voting areas for the referendum throughout Scotland.

Scotland was broken down into 32 voting areas.

While all council counting areas show a majority to remain, one constituency, Banff and Buchan, voted to leave by an estimated ratio of 54% to 46%. Voting to leave the EU was most concentrated around the north coast of Aberdeenshire between the fishing towns of Banff and Peterhead, where there were 23,707 Leave votes to 14,918 Remain votes (61% Leave 39% Remain).

The areas of Whalsay and South Unst in the Shetland Islands and An Taobh Siar and Nis in Na h-Eileanan an Iar (The Western Isles) also voted by a majority for Leave, as did the town of Lossiemouth in Moray.

Wales 

The Welsh council areas were used as the voting areas for the referendum throughout Wales.

A total of 650,000 inhabitants born in England live in Wales (21%), with the areas with the highest percentages voting to leave. The majority to leave the EU was 82,000. The map shows council areas comprising ex-heavy industrial places and English-speaking as a common preference as areas where Leave won out. Parts of rural Wales also saw a leave-vote majority (but also Anglesey where Welsh is just as commonly if not more usually spoken). Cardiff, the Plaid Cymru heartland of the two council areas in West Wales, and by wafer-thin margins affluent Monmouthshire and the Vale of Glamorgan were the areas where Remain held sway.

Note: In Wales under the Welsh Language Act 1993 the Welsh language has equal status with the English language.

Wales was broken down into 22 voting areas.

Results by constituency

The vote was not counted by Commons seat except in Northern Ireland. Some local councils (districts) republished local results by electoral ward or constituency. Some constituencies are coterminous with (overlap) their local government district. For the others Dr Chris Hanretty, a Reader in Politics at the University of East Anglia, estimated through a demographic model the 'Leave' and 'Remain' vote. Hanretty urges caution in the interpretation of the data as the estimates have a margin of error.

Estimated net preference of constituencies by party of the incumbent

Please note that this table does not show how each party's traditional voters voted in the referendum. It shows the estimated (or actual) net decision in 648 of the 650 seats and the incumbents reflect those returned at the 2015 general election.

List of constituency results

While votes were tallied by district, there were two sources of by constituency result available within a short time of the referendum.  Firstly a model by Chris Hanretty, based on the published results by district, and secondly 82 results calculated by the BBC based on ward results obtained from the local authorities.

In the following table, Hanretty's results are marked with "(est.)".

Most heavily tilted areas

Most heavily Leave areas
The following were the ten voting areas that voted most heavily in favour of leave. All but one of them were in the East Midlands and East of England regions, with four of the ten, including the top two, located in Lincolnshire.

Most heavily Remain areas
The following were the ten voting areas that voted most heavily in favour of remain. Of the ten, seven were in the Greater London region.

Most evenly divided areas
The narrowest margin of victory for any of the 382 voting areas in the United Kingdom was in the Scottish council area of Moray, which voted by just 122 votes or 0.25% margin in favour of Remain.

In England the narrowest margins of victory for Leave were in Watford which voted by just 252 votes or 0.54% margin in favour of Leave, and in Cherwell which voted by just 500 votes or 0.61% margin in favour of Leave. The narrowest margin of victory for Remain was in the London Borough of Bromley, which voted by just 2,364 votes or a 1.30% margin in favour of Remain.

Narrowest Leave vote

Narrowest Remain vote

Turnout by age group
After the referendum, the annual British Social Attitudes survey questioned the public on their participation. Interviewing was mainly carried out between July and October 2016 and respondents were subdivided into three age groups (18–34, 35–64 and >/=65). The survey revealed that turnout was higher in the older age groups, and was 64%, 80% and 89% respectively. The age disparity had also been a feature of previous elections and referendums. However, compared to the previous referendum in 2011, the young voters' turnout in 2016 had increased sharply by 31%, while turnout by the two older age categories had also increased, but only by 26% and 21%.

Irregularities

In July 2018, Vote Leave was found to have broken electoral law, spending over its limit, by the UK's Electoral Commission. Connected to this, the Information Commissioner's Office found that data had been unlawfully harvested from UK voters, and issued a notice of intent to fine Facebook £500,000. Also, the House of Commons Culture, Media and Sport Select Committee, released an interim report on "Disinformation and 'fake news, stating that Russia had engaged in "unconventional warfare" through Twitter and other social media against the United Kingdom, designed to amplify support for a "leave" vote in Brexit. It also found that it could not be satisfied that the largest donor in the Brexit campaign, Arron Banks, used money from UK sources, and may have been financed by the Russian government.
In July 2018 the Electoral Commission, Information Commissioner's Office, and the House of Commons Digital, Culture, Media and Sport Committee issued reports, finding variously criminal offences of overspending by Vote Leave, data offences, and foreign interference by Russia. In August 2018, this led to legal challenges to declare the referendum void for violating common law and United Kingdom constitutional law. In May 2020, the Electoral Commission, which had referred Banks to the National Crime Agency for investigation of these allegations, conceded that he did not break electoral law during the 2016 EU referendum campaign.

See also

Results of the 2016 United Kingdom European Union membership referendum by constituency
European Union Referendum Act 2015
European Communities Act 1972 (UK)
1975 United Kingdom European Communities membership referendum
Results of the 1975 United Kingdom European Communities membership referendum
Referendum Act 1975
European Union (Amendment) Act 2008
European Union Act 2011
2015–16 United Kingdom renegotiation of European Union membership
European Union (Notification of Withdrawal) Act 2017
European Union (Withdrawal) Act 2018

Notes

References

2016 United Kingdom European Union membership referendum
Referendums related to the European Union
Election results in the United Kingdom